The 2016 Remus F3 Cup was the 35th Austria Formula 3 Cup season and the fourth Remus F3 Cup season.

Despite missing the fifth round of the season, Sandro Zeller of Jo Zeller Racing was crowned champion by 69 points over Franz Wöss Racing driver Kurt Böhlen.

Teams and drivers
All Cup cars were built between 2005 and 2011, while Trophy cars were built between 1992 and 2004.

Numbers used at Remus F3 Cup events listed; numbers used at races run to F2 Italian Trophy regulations displayed in tooltips.

Calendar & Race results
Round 2 and 4 (Imola and Hockenheim) were held together with the F2 Italian Trophy. However, no Italian F2 Trophy competitors were eligible to score Remus F3 Cup points.

Championship standings

Cup

Trophy

German F3 Trophy

Swiss F3 Cup

External links
Website of the AFR Cups [German]

Austria Formula 3 Cup
Remus F3 Cup
Remus F3 Cup